Yeoville is an inner city neighbourhood  of Johannesburg, in the province of Gauteng, South Africa. It is located in Region F (previously Region 8). It is widely known and celebrated for its diverse,  pan-African population but notorious for its high levels of crime and poverty.

It is part of Greater Yeoville, a greater territory combining Bellevue, Bellevue East and Yeoville itself and its size, crime, poverty and population density levels is somewhat comparable to nearby Hillbrow. Yeoville is home to Yeoville Boys Primary School, Yeoville Market and Yeoville recreational centre.

History

Founding
Yeoville was proclaimed as a suburb in 1890 (four years after the discovery of gold led to the founding of Johannesburg) by Thomas Yeo Sherwell, who came from Yeovil in the United Kingdom. The area was advertised as a 'sanitarium for the rich' in which the air was purer because it was up on a ridge overlooking the dirty, smoke-filled mining town that had sprung from nothing out of the (then) Transvaal bushveld. However, the rich did not buy into the suburb. Instead it became a multiclass area, one to which many poorer people living below the ridge in Doornfontein aspired. It was also a place which attracted many of the waves of migrants from abroad that came to South Africa seeking a new life..

1970s
By the 1970s, it had a predominantly Jewish character, with a number of synagogues in the area and Jewish delicatessens and bakeries in the main business street. Harry Schwarz, a well known Jewish lawyer and politician was Member of Parliament for Yeoville from 1974 to 1991.

Over the years Yeoville, and its neighbouring suburb Bellevue, also attracted its fair share of artists, musicians, students and political activists. However, it was in the late 1970s that a process began which would change the nature of these two suburbs forever. The establishment of a small, discreet club by a well-known music producer called Patric van Blerk resulted in the main business street through the two suburbs, named Raleigh St in Yeoville and Rockey St in Bellevue, becoming the bohemian cultural centre of South Africa, with a number of night spots and restaurants moving from nearby Hillbrow, till then the night-time entertainment mecca of Johannesburg. Within two years, the high street was transformed from a quiet community street serving the local residents to an internationally-known cultural centre with restaurants, jazz bars, bookshops, arts and crafts outlets, trendy clothing outlets, photography studios and record shops. On the down side, drug dealers and a criminal element also moved into the area, taking advantage of the opportunities arising out of the almost 24-hour buzz of activity in the street.

1980s
The 1980s was a time of political turmoil in South Africa as the United Democratic Front (UDF), a legal internal organisation sympathetic to (indeed for some a front for) the African National Congress (ANC, the banned liberation movement), took the apartheid state on with a fury not seen since the 1960s. Rockey St (always mistakenly located in people's minds in Yeoville while it was actually in Bellevue) and indeed the entire area, became something of a liberated zone as black and white met and ate and listened to music together in defiance of prevailing apartheid laws. Some blacks even lived in the area in flats rented for them by white nominees.
Yeoville continued to be a popular place for young fashionable people to congregate with many varied businesses on Rockey Street. One of the well known professional photography studios on Rockey Street was Latent Image, owned and operated by the photographers Alan Aarons and Ian Joseph.

1990s
In 1990, the apartheid government unbanned the ANC, the South African Communist Party and the Pan Africanist Congress and began to release political prisoners, the most famous of whom was Nelson Mandela (Mandela has a link to Yeoville – he was apparently given refuge in the Webb St flat of one of his white comrades when he was on the run from the police in the early 1960s). This started the process that led to the holding of the first-ever fully democratic elections in South Africa in April 1994.

The end of apartheid had a profound impact on Yeoville and Bellevue. In the early 1990s, Rockey Street remained a hotbed of radicals, activists, artists and musicians. Journalists from around the world lived and worked there during the transition, and places like Ba-Pita, the Harbour Cafe, Coffee Society, Tandoor and many others attracted large numbers of visitors.

However, in the hiatus period between 1990 and 1994, as South Africa's political opponents went through alternating bouts of negotiation and confrontation, and after 1994, urban management went into decline. Added to this, there began a dramatic demographic shift, with the population of Yeoville changing from 85% white in 1990 to 90% black in 1998. The flight of whites out of the area in some ways gave the lie to the apparently liberated nature of the area in the 1980s. While seemingly non-racial in that period, the area was still definitely under the 'control' of the white population. But after 1990, many realised that that control was gone and the period of white flight began. The trendy types moved to newly emerging night spots like Melville, while the majority of the Jewish population moved north to Sydenham and Glenhazel.

The death knell for that period was also the death of a black Jamaican. Ridley Wright had married a South African exile and returned with her after 1990. He was owner of Crackers Deli, a popular cafe, and head of the Yeoville Trader's Association. In an altercation with a street corner drug dealer, he was fatally stabbed. It was downhill from there and by 2000, all of the shops and restaurants that gained fame in the 1980s were gone or transformed unrecognisably. The lack of effective urban management also saw the area entering a period of rapid urban decay and neglect, caused in part, by the new local government having to share what were resources for the previously-whites only areas with neglected black areas like Soweto and Alexandra. Added to this, banking groups, unnerved by the change and worried about their money, 'red-lined' the area, refusing to grant 100% mortgages to prospective home-owners in the area, most of whom were black. This meant that the proportion of rental to owner housing stock changed, with a far greater number of people renting than owning. The majority of these are black South Africans from all over the country and increasing numbers of immigrants from all corners of Africa. Renting was not cheap and the relative poverty of tenants in these properties meant that many overcrowded the property so as to share the rental with a greater number of people. The result was neglect of and damage to the properties and an overloading of the infrastructure of the area.

2000s
Yeoville is once again a community of migrants, mostly economic migrants from all over the country and the rest of Africa. It is  a vibrant, colourful, often chaotic pan-African area.

Community organisations and individuals have been working since 1995 to try to arrest the decay and influence the socio-economic future of the area. As a result of their efforts, Yeoville is currently undergoing some major upgrading including the physical regeneration of Rockey Raleigh Street through the replacement of all paving and the installation of two tier lights to make the streets brighter and safer. The park has been upgraded and the library is being moved to bigger and better premises. CCTV cameras have been installed on five intersections as an attempt to reduce incidences of crime. Entrepreneurs are also showing interest in the commercial properties in Rockey Raleigh St which may result in an economic revival.

Due to sometimes over-inflated house prices elsewhere in Johannesburg, Yeoville is slowly attracting middle-income groups again which is beginning to put the brakes on urban decay. The local authority has recognised that Yeoville and Bellevue, together with the rest of the inner city, are in need of special attention. In 2007, the City of Johannesburg signed an Inner City Charter with property owners, business people and community organisations, committing themselves to improved urban management and bylaw enforcement. The fruits of this agreement are beginning to be seen.

2010s
Unfortunately agreements were not met and Yeoville continued its downward spiral as government neglect further contributed to its high crime and poverty rate as well as poor service delivery notably with water, electricity and sewage. Despite all this, the community continues to be resilient making efforts to clean up Its streets.

2020s
The COVID-19 pandemic saw a surge in crime and poverty in the community as in the whole inner city as households struggled to survive but it also came a time for innovation as people got more creative with their businesses. The state of Yeoville today has slightly improved as some community members took matters into their own hands and cleaned up its streets and the Yeoville Community board on which flat vacancies were advertised was taken down and there are no longer street hawkers in the busy Raleigh Street. The Yeoville Police Station continues its crackdown on crime and drugs in the streets and slumlords in hijacked buildings.

References

Johannesburg Region F
Jews and Judaism in Johannesburg